Dreams Beyond Control is the seventeenth album by the American jazz group Spyro Gyra, released in 1993 by GRP Records. The group supported the album with a North American tour.

The album peaked in the top 5 on Billboards Top Contemporary Jazz Albums chart.

Production
The album was produced by Jay Beckenstein. Alex Ligertwood sang on Dreams Beyond Control; it was the first time a Spyro Gyra album contained vocals in English. The Tower of Power Horns played on the album. The group experimented with the songs on tour before recording them. ""Waltz for Isabel" is a tribute to Beckenstein's third daughter.

Critical reception

The Chicago Tribune deemed the album "a rather leaden excursion into R&B-flavored pop-fusion." The Boston Herald concluded that "beneath this somewhat tougher exterior beats the same faint musical heart, full of sweet melodies, perky rhythms and chatty solos—but every bit as empty of risk and guts as ever."

 Track listing 
 "Walk the Walk" (Julio Fernandez) – 4:20
 "Patterns in the Rain" (Foster Paterson) – 4:38
 "Breakfast at Igor's" (Jay Beckenstein, Scott Ambush) – 5:23
 "Waltz for Isabel" (Beckenstein) – 4:43
 "South Beach" (Fernandez) – 5:13
 "Send Me One Line" (John Martyn) – 4:57
 "Bahia" (Dave Samuels) – 5:08
 "Kindred Spirit" (Tom Schuman) – 4:05
 "Birks Law" (Beckenstein) – 4:36
 "Same Difference" (Beckenstein, Fernandez) – 5:25
 "The Delicate Prey" (Jeremy Wall) – 5:33

 Personnel Spyro Gyra Jay Beckenstein – saxophone
 Tom Schuman – keyboards
 Julio Fernández – guitars
 Scott Ambush – bass
 Joel Rosenblatt – drums
 Dave Samuels – vibraphone, marimba, malletsAdditional Personnel Howard Levy – harmonica (3)
 Marc Quiñones – percussion (5, 7)
 Cyro Baptista – percussion (7, 11)
 Alex Ligertwood – vocals (2, 6)
 Lani Groves – backing vocals (6)
 Will Lee – backing vocals (6)
 Vaneese Thomas – backing vocals (6)Tower of Power Horns (Tracks 1 & 3) Stephen "Doc" Kupka – baritone saxophone
 Emilio Castillo – tenor saxophone
 David Mann – tenor saxophone
 Greg Adams – trumpet, horn arrangements 
 Alan Chez – trumpetNo Sweat Horns (Tracks 5, 7 & 10)'
 Scott Kreitzer – tenor saxophone, flute, piccolo flute
 Randy Andos – trombone, bass trombone 
 Barry Danielian – trumpet, flugelhorn, horn arrangements

Production 
 Jay Beckenstein – producer 
 Jeremy Wall – assistant producer 
 Phil Brennan – assistant producer, management
 Larry Swist – assistant producer, recording, mixing 
 Dave Grusin – executive producer 
 Larry Rosen – executive producer 
 Kevin Becka – assistant engineer 
 Steve Regina – assistant engineer 
 Dann Wojner – assistant engineer
 Ted Jensen – mastering 
 Joseph Doughney – post-production technician
 Michael Landy – post-production technician
 Michael Pollard – production coordinator 
 Diane Dragonette – assistant production coordinator 
 Sonny Mediana – production director
 Sharon Franklin – assistant production director
 Andy Baltimore – creative director 
 Scott Johnson – art direction
 Dan Serrano – art direction
 Alba Acevedo – graphic design 
 Jackie Salway – graphic design 
 Martin LaBorde – front cover illustration 
 David A. Wagner – color photography

Additional Studios
 Mastered at Sterling Sound (New York City, New York).
 Post-Production at The Review Room (New York City, New York).

References

External links
 Spyro Gyra official web site

1993 albums
Spyro Gyra albums
GRP Records albums